Azariah Southworth (born May 13, 1986) is an American writer and former television presenter of The Remix - a syndicated reality show on the NRB, TBN, JCTV, and VTN networks.  The Remix featured Christian artists such as Jars of Clay, Rachael Lampa, Shane & Shane and watched by more than 200,000 viewers a week.

Raised in Orland, Indiana, Southworth currently resides in Los Angeles. He announced he is gay on Wednesday, April 16, 2008, stating, "This has been a long time coming. I’m in a place where I’m at peace with my faith, friends, family and more importantly myself. I know this will end my career in Christian television, but I must now live my life openly and honestly with everyone. This is my reason for doing this." After making this public to  Out & About Newspaper in Nashville, Southworth subsequently became the first Christian entertainer to come out publicly. The story was covered by The Huffington Post, PerezHilton.com, The Advocate, and Fox News Channel.

After coming out, Southworth was named one of Instinct's "Leading Men of 2008".  Southworth has advocated for LGBT rights with the Soulforce Q "2008 Equality Ride". In 2010, Southworth was the opening act for gay Christian singer Ray Boltz on his "Living True: The Tour". In 2020, Audity launched Yass, Jesus!, an LGBTQ and faith affirming podcast, with Southworth and actor Daniel Franzese as the hosts. The show aims to help others see the queer and trans narratives in the Bible through storytelling and comedy. Yass, Jesus! is produced by Ross Murray and Meredith Paulley.

See also

 Christianity and homosexuality
 List of people from Nashville, Tennessee

References

External links
 AzariahSpeaks.com official website
 "Why I outed a Christian star", a Salon article by Southworth

1986 births
American gay writers
LGBT Protestants
Living people
Writers from Los Angeles
People from Nashville, Tennessee
People from Orland, Indiana
21st-century LGBT people